The 2013 Patriot League baseball tournament was held on consecutive weekends, with the semifinals held May 11–12 and the finals May 19-20.  The higher seeded teams hosted each best of three series.  Third seeded  defeated  for the second year in a row, and Army's seventh tournament title, to earn the conference's automatic bid to the 2013 NCAA Division I baseball tournament.  Army and Holy Cross met in the final for the second consecutive year.

Seeding
The top four finishers from the regular season were seeded one through four, with the top seed hosting the fourth seed and second seed hosting the third.  The visiting team wa designated as the home team in the second game of each series.  In the semifinals, Holy Cross hosted Bucknell, while Navy hosted defending champion Army.

Results

Semifinals

Holy Cross vs. Bucknell

Army vs. Navy

Final

All-Tournament Team
The following players were named to the All-Tournament Team.

Most Valuable Player
Chris Rowley was named Tournament Most Valuable Player.  Rowley was a pitcher for Army, earning a complete game victory in game one of each series.

References

Patriot League Baseball Tournament
Patriot League baseball tournament
Tournament
Patriot League baseball tournament
Baseball in Worcester, Massachusetts
Baseball competitions in Massachusetts
College sports tournaments in Massachusetts